Danforth is an unincorporated community in Adair County, in the U.S. state of Missouri.

The community is on Missouri Route O 1.5 miles northwest of Novinger. Spring Creek flows past the south side of the community.

History
A post office called Danforth was established in 1885, and remained in operation until 1906. The name most likely is a transfer from Danforth, Illinois.

References

Unincorporated communities in Adair County, Missouri
1885 establishments in Missouri
Unincorporated communities in Missouri